"A la Primera Persona" is a love song recorded by the Spanish singer-songwriter Alejandro Sanz. It was released as the first single from his album El Tren de los Momentos (2006). The song reached the number-one spot on the Billboard Hot Latin Tracks and Latin Pop Airplay charts.

Music video
The music video of the song starts with a scene in which a train is seen passing during sunrise. Then, Alejandro is seen walking alone on the street. He then picks up a newspaper from a garbage can and starts to read it. He continues to walk and suddenly sees some objects lying in the middle of the street. He picks up a guitar, which is also thrown there. It is then revealed that he owns the objects, and that his girlfriend was the one who threw them there after an argument with him.

Chart performance

References

External links
"A la Primera Persona" lyrics

2006 singles
Number-one singles in Spain
Spanish-language songs
Alejandro Sanz songs
Songs written by Alejandro Sanz
2006 songs
Warner Music Latina singles